Predrag "Peca" Jaćimović is a Serbian basketball coach.

Coaching career 
Jaćimović coached Lavovi 063, OKK Beograd, Ergonom, Napredak Aleksinac, Crnokosa, Zlatibor and Konstantin. He also coached clubs in Bosnia and Herzegovina (Banjalučka pivara and Radnik Bijeljina), Slovenia (Zlatorog Laško and Krka) and Macedonia (MZT Skopje).

References

External links 
 Predrag Jaćimović Biography
 Profile at eurobasket.com

1957 births
Living people
KK Borac Banja Luka coaches
KK Crnokosa coaches
KK Crvena zvezda assistant coaches
KK Ergonom coaches
KK Milicionar Beograd coaches
KK Napredak Aleksinac coaches
KK Lavovi 063 coaches
KK Plana coaches
KK Radnik Bijeljina coaches
KK Rtanj coaches
KK Zlatibor coaches
OKK Beograd coaches
OKK Konstantin coaches
Serbian expatriate basketball people in Bosnia and Herzegovina
Serbian expatriate basketball people in North Macedonia
Serbian expatriate basketball people in Slovenia
Serbian men's basketball coaches
People from Smederevska Palanka